Fabricio Ortiz (born March 17 1990) is an Argentine footballer who currently plays for Ecuadorian Serie B side Club Atlético Porteño as a defender.

Career
Ortiz played 23 matches for Jacksonville Armada in the North American Soccer League in the 2015 season. After a spell in Jordan, Ortiz joined I-League side Gokulam Kerala. He left the club at the end of 2018. On February 28, 2019 he signed with Club Atlético Porteño of Ecuadorian Serie B.

References

External links
 

1990 births
Living people
Argentine footballers
North American Soccer League players
Jacksonville Armada FC players
Association football defenders
I-League players
Gokulam Kerala FC players
Fort Lauderdale Strikers players
Shabab Al-Aqaba Club players
Alumni de Villa María players
Argentine expatriate footballers
Expatriate soccer players in the United States
Argentine expatriate sportspeople in the United States
Expatriate footballers in India
Argentine expatriate sportspeople in India
People from Casilda
Sportspeople from Santa Fe Province